Lenora Antoinette Stines (born September 5, 1951), better known as L'Antoinette Ọṣun Awade Wemo Stines is a Jamaican director, choreographer, author, actor and dancer. She is the founder and artistic director of L'Acadco: A United Caribbean Dance Force, an industry-leading contemporary dance company based in Jamaica. Stines is also the creator of the first Anglo Caribbean Modern Contemporary training procedure called L'Antech. L'Antech is an eclectic Caribbean contemporary technique that synthesizes African influences, Caribbean folklore, and is dominated by Jamaican Afro-Caribbean forms.

L'Antoinette Stines holds a Ph.D. from the University of the West Indies (2010) Mona Campus in Kingston, Jamaica in Cultural Studies. Stines is especially acclaimed for her work as a choreographer, technique professor and teacher. She lectures internationally on the traditional dance forms such as Kumina, Bruckins, Nyabinghi, Dancehall and the contemporary dance synthesis L'Antech.

Career
In 1978, Dr. L'Antionette Stines founded Miami's first primarily black dance company, L'Acadco, with a vision of bringing together the tri-ethnic communities of Spanish, African-American and Caucasian. Returning to Jamaica in 1982, L'Acadco was reborn with a different intention to present contemporary dance with a new voice, fresh and valid interpretations of the Jamaican landscape. Stines was the first choreographer to showcase Dancehall on a proscenium stage at the Little Theatre in Kingston, Jamaica in her renowned piece called "Bouyaka Bouyaka" (1984). Stines is also the first Artistic Director in Jamaica to fight the cause for payment of dancers.

Stines released her first book, Soul Casings, on 5 July 2014. Soul Casings introduces L'Antech, the Anglophone Caribbean's first CARIMOD dance technique. The book is specifically designed as an introductory text explaining the path towards the philosophies underpinning the creation of the technique. Soul Casings was launched at the Philip Sherlock Center for the Creative Arts on the Mona Campus. Stines describes the title of the book as "I see the body as an encasement of the soul, and unless you engage the soul when you dance, then you are really just doing something else other than dancing", reported by the Jamaica Observer.

Stines was the Director of Movement/Lead Choreographer for ICC Cricket World Cup Opening Ceremony- Jamaica (2007). Artistic Director for CARIFESTA XII- Haiti (2015). Stines was nominated for the Dora Mavor Moore Award (2018) in Toronto, Canada for Outstanding Choreography for the Watah Theatre production "Lukumi: A Dub Opera"

Stines is also an actor, known for Luke Cage (2018), a Netflix series based on a Marvel Comics character, and Dancehall Is Us (2016). Dancehall Is Us is a 20-minute documentary about the culture of dance and musical traditions of Jamaica director and written by Egor Papulov. The film is a study of the nature of style dancehall, roots, street culture and style of life of the citizens brings the viewer to understand the country as a whole. The film is, in a sense, a portrait of Jamaica today. Dancehall Is Us has won the following awards: Best Shot at the Bellingham Music Film Festival (2016), Best Documentary at the Portobello Film Festival, Best Short at Rubber International Festival of Music on Cinema, Winner of Best Editing of a Documentary Award at TTMFF To Tylko Montaz Film Festival (2016) and Best International Short Documentary at Film Internacional de Cortometrajes Libelula Dorado and has been nominated for many others.

L'Antech
L'Antech is the first Anglo Caribbean Modern Contemporary (CARIMOD) dance training procedure. L'Antech is an eclectic Caribbean contemporary technique that synthesizes African influences, Caribbean folklore, and is dominated by Jamaican Afro-Caribbean forms. It is constructed to train dancers through an embodies remembering of the Caribbean's integral ancestral lineages such as European, Asian and the dominantly African. L'Antech is a dance technique that like patois is a product of creolization using a process introduced herein as synerbridging. Stines describes L'Antech explaining that, "The dominant retention among the majority of people of the Caribbean is African and this is represented from the waist down in L'Antech. Asia takes care of the arms and the feet while Europe is represented in the forms of classical ballet," reported by the Jamaica Observer.

Filmography 
Babymother (1998), choreographer
Dancehall Queen (1997), choreographer
Luke Cage, Season 2 Episode 11 (2017-2018), actor and consultant

Publications 

 Kumina to L’Antech: An overview of the Anglo-Caribbean Contemporary Carimod Dance Technique, 2015
 From Dance to Daance: Embracing Ancestral Riddims in Creolisation in Dance, edited by Pawlette Brooks, Leicester, United Kingdom, 2015
 Ruckumbine! Jamaican Body Memories in Jamaica Land We Love: A Post- Independence Legacy of Nation Building, Edited by Elaine L. Duval, Zebulon House Publishers, 2014
 Soul Casings: A journey from Classical Ballet to the Carimod Dance Technique L’Antech, 2014
 The Politics of the Visual and the Vocal: Claiming Naming: Researching Naming in Caribbean Dance through the Paradigm of L’Antech, Caribbean Intransit, 2011
 Critique of Rex Nettleford’s “Dance Jamaica Dance” in Kaieteur New Arts Column/The Arts Forum and The Arts Journal Volumes 6 – 1&2, 2010
 Does the Caribbean Body Dance or Daaance? An Exploration of Modern Contemporary Dance From Caribbean Perspectives , Caribbean quarterly Volume 51- 3&4,University of the West Indies, 2005

Honours and awards 

2018 RJR/Gleaner Communications Group • Arts and Culture award to L’Acadco for its role in promoting Caribbean culture on the world stage
2018 QRIHC queen of reggae award • Excellence in dance
2018 The Doctor Bird Award for Cultural Industries-Dance 2015 Jamaica Dance Umbrella • Citation for Recognition of Outstanding Contributions to Dance in Jamaica
2014 Literary Festival and Cultural showcase University of Technology Jamaica • Award for 30 years of Excellence in Dance, Education and Production and for positioning Traditional Jamaican Dance Forms on the International Stage
2013 The Alpha Academy Association • Women of Excellence Award
2012 Caymanas Track  • Outstanding Contribution to the Creative Arts – Dance
2012 Dancing Dynamites Competition  • Outstanding Contribution to Dance in Jamaica
2011 American Chamber of Commerce in Jamaica  • The AMCHAM Jamaica Business and Civic Leadership Award
2011 Ministry of Information, Culture, Youth and Sport Jamaica  • Sterling Contribution to Dance in general and in St. Kitts in particular
2003 Alpha Academy  • Woman of Excellence Award
1994 Brillante Participacion en el Proyecto Cultural del Estado Villahermosa T obasco
1985 London Borough of Lewisham • Governor’s Award
1981 The Jamaican Cultural and Civic Association of Florida • Outstanding Contribution to the Cultural Arts

References

External links
 
 
 

21st-century Jamaican actresses
21st-century Jamaican women writers
Jamaican choreographers
Jamaican female dancers
Living people
Date of birth missing (living people)
Place of birth missing (living people)
1951 births